Mohamed El-Minabawi (4 May 1927 – September 2004) was an Egyptian boxer. He competed at the 1948 Summer Olympics and the 1952 Summer Olympics.

References

1927 births
2004 deaths
Egyptian male boxers
Olympic boxers of Egypt
Boxers at the 1948 Summer Olympics
Boxers at the 1952 Summer Olympics
Place of birth missing
Mediterranean Games medalists in boxing
Light-heavyweight boxers
Mediterranean Games silver medalists for Egypt
Boxers at the 1951 Mediterranean Games
20th-century Egyptian people